Guns N' Roses is the second EP by American hard rock band Guns N' Roses. It was released in 1988.

Background 
The record was released in Japan only and features "Sweet Child O' Mine" from the album Appetite for Destruction plus tracks that had been previously released in 1987 on the 12" singles of "It's So Easy"/"Mr. Brownstone" and "Welcome to the Jungle". It appears to be self-titled, as no title apart from the band's name appears anywhere on the cover. However, the EP is often called Live from the Jungle, named so because part of the large red text on the album's obi strip reads ライブ・フロム・ザ・ジャングル ガンズ・アンド・ローゼズ ("Raibu furomu za janguru / Ganzu ando rozezu"), meaning "Live from the jungle: Guns N' Roses". This is a reference to the song "Welcome to the Jungle", even though the song itself doesn't appear on the EP. The record has been released in vinyl, cassette, and CD format.

Tracks one, four and five were recorded live at the Marquee Club in London on June 28, 1987. Tracks two and three are studio recordings with overdubbed crowd noise. Track three was originally released on the EP Live ?!*@ Like a Suicide and later on the album G N' R Lies. Track 6 is the studio version from Appetite for Destruction. The cover features the banned Robert Williams artwork also used (but very briefly) for Appetite for Destruction.

Track listing

Personnel 
W. Axl Rose – lead vocals
Slash – lead guitar
Izzy Stradlin – rhythm guitar, backing vocals
Duff "Rose" McKagan – bass guitar, backing vocals
Steven Adler – drums, percussion

References

External links 

1988 EPs
Guns N' Roses EPs
Albums produced by Vic Maile
Geffen Records EPs
Live albums recorded at The Marquee Club